The Giro d'Italia Femminile has been won three times by a racer who led the general classification on the first stage and held the lead all the way to finish. Catherine Marsal was the first to accomplish this achievement in the 1990 Giro, with Fabiana Luperini and Nicole Brändli doing the same in 1996 and 2005 respectively.

Pink Jersey

Individual records

The "Jerseys" column lists the number of days that the cyclist wore the pink jersey. The next five columns indicate the number of times the rider won the general classification, points classification, the Queen of the Mountains classification, and the young rider competition, and the years in which the pink jersey was worn, with bold years indicating an overall Giro win. For example: Fabiana Luperini has spent 40 days in the pink jersey, won the general classification five times, won the points classification once, won the mountains classification four times, and never won the young rider classification. She wore the pink jersey in the Giros of 1995, 1996, 1997, 1998, 2008 (which she all won). Roberta Bonanomi in 1989 is the only rider to have won the Giro d'Italia Femminile with only one pink jerseys in their career.

Diana Žiliūtė is, as of 2017 with fourteen days in pink, the rider with the most pink jerseys ever for someone who has not won the Giro. The three active Giro d'Italia Femminile winners Marianne Vos, Megan Guarnier and Anna van der Breggen rank, as of 2017, 2nd, joint 8th, and 16th with thirty three, eleven each, and eight days in pink respectively.

Number of wears per year
 Table up to 2021.
The largest number of different riders wearing the pink jersey in any year is 6. The smallest is 1.

Wearers by Country
 The following table is valid up to 2018.
The pink jersey has been awarded to 15 different countries since 1988.

Winning margin

Stage Wins

Stage wins per rider 
 This table is correct as of stage 6 of the Giro d'Italia Femminile 2019.
17 riders have won 5 stages or more (including half-stages, excluding Team Time Trials). Riders with the same number of stage wins are ordered alphabetically using surname.

Key:

Order of first Victory

Stage wins per country 
Riders from 21 countries have won at least one stage in the Giro d'Italia Femminile.

Notes

References

Cycling records and statistics
Giro d'Italia Femminile